Costas Miamiliotis (born August 1, 1960) is a Cypriot former international football defender.

He started his career in 1977 from APOEL. In 1989, he moved to Pezoporikos where he totally played for three years. In 1992, he returned to APOEL where he ended his career in 1994. APOEL fans characterized him as legend.

External links
 

1960 births
Living people
APOEL FC players
Cypriot footballers
Cyprus international footballers
Greek Cypriot people
Association football defenders